The simple station Carrera 90 is part of the TransMilenio mass-transit system of Bogotá, Colombia, opened in the year 2000.

Location

The station is located in northwestern Bogotá, specifically on Calle 80 Carrera 90.

History

In 2000, phase one of the TransMilenio system was opened between Portal de la 80 and Tercer Milenio, including this station. The station is named Carrera 90 due to its location at the intersection of that road with Avenida Calle 80. It serves the demand of the Primavera Norte, Los Cerezos, and París Gaitán neighborhoods. On its north side, there is a small shopping center called Primavera.

Station Services

Old trunk services

Main line service

Feeder routes

This station does not have connections to feeder routes.

Inter-city service

This station does not have inter-city service.

External links
TransMilenio

See also
Bogotá
TransMilenio
List of TransMilenio Stations

TransMilenio